Hovde Glacier is a small glacier just west of the Brattstrand Bluffs, and east of Amanda Bay, on the south-eastern shore of Prydz Bay, Antarctica. A short tongue from this glacier extends seaward to nearby Hovde Island. The glacier was first mapped by the Lars Christensen Expedition, 1936–37, which named the island. It was named "Hovde Ice Tongue" by John H. Roscoe in 1952 following his study of aerial photographs of the area taken by U.S. Navy Operation Highjump, 1946–47, but the term glacier is considered appropriate to this small feature.

See also
 List of glaciers in the Antarctic
 Glaciology

References

Glaciers of Ingrid Christensen Coast